Jacobus Christo Janse van Rensburg (born 9 January 1986) is a South African rugby union footballer. His regular playing position is prop.

In 2013, he signed a two-year deal with French team Bayonne.

In July 2015, it was announced that Janse van Rensburg would return to South Africa to link up with Cape Town-based outfit the  prior to the 2016 Super Rugby season, signing a two-year deal with the side.

He returned to France after the 2018 Super Rugby season, joining .

References

External links

Lions profile
itsrugby.co.uk profile

1986 births
Living people
People from Prince Albert Local Municipality
Afrikaner people
South African people of Dutch descent
South African rugby union players
Sharks (rugby union) players
Golden Lions players
Lions (United Rugby Championship) players
Rugby union props
South Africa international rugby union players
Rugby union players from the Western Cape